The Toyota 120 is a NASCAR stock car race, competed as part of the NASCAR Mexico Series at Phoenix International Raceway. The inaugural running of the event in 2013 was the first NASCAR Toyota Series race ever held outside Mexico, and served as the season-opening event for the 2013 NASCAR Toyota Series season.

Past winners

References

2013 establishments in Arizona
 
NASCAR Mexico Series races
Recurring sporting events established in 2013